Stoyan Stoichkov (born 18 July 2003) is a Bulgarian footballer who plays as a midfielder for Hebar Pazardzhik on loan from CSKA 1948.

Career
Stoichkov began his youth career in Septemvri Sofia. In 2020 he was moved to the main team, before joining CSKA 1948 on 29 December 2021. In the summer of 2022 Lyuboslav Penev took him to the first team. He compleated his professional debut for CSKA 1948 on 9 July 2022 in a league win over Levski Sofia.

International career
In September 2022 he received his first call up for Bulgaria U21 for the friendly matches against Hungary U21 and Serbia U21 on 23 and 27 September.

Career statistics

Club

References

External links
 

2003 births
Living people
Bulgarian footballers
Bulgaria youth international footballers
FC Septemvri Sofia players
FC CSKA 1948 Sofia players
First Professional Football League (Bulgaria) players
Association football midfielders